Metacritic is a website that aggregates reviews of films, television shows, music albums, video games, and formerly books. For each product, the scores from each review are averaged (a weighted average). Metacritic was created by Jason Dietz, Marc Doyle, and Julie Doyle Roberts in 1999, and is owned by Fandom, Inc. as of 2023.

Metacritic's scoring converts each review into a percentage, either mathematically from the mark given, or what the site decides subjectively from a qualitative review. Before being averaged, the scores are weighted according to a critic's popularity, stature, and volume of reviews. The site provides an excerpt from each review and hyperlinks to its source. A color of green, yellow, or red summarizes the critics' reviews.

Metacritic won two Webby Awards for excellence as an aggregation website. It is regarded as the foremost online review aggregation site for the video game industry. Criticism of the site has focused on the assessment system, the assignment of scores to reviews that do not include ratings, third-party attempts to influence the scores, and lack of staff oversight for user reviews.

History 

Metacritic was launched in January 2001 by Marc Doyle, his sister Julie Doyle Roberts, and his University of Southern California law classmate Jason Dietz, after two years of developing the site. Rotten Tomatoes was already compiling movie reviews, but Doyle, Roberts, and Dietz saw an opportunity to cover a broader range of media.

Metacritic was sold to CNET in 2005. CNET and Metacritic were later acquired by the CBS Corporation. In 2020, Metacritic and other CNET titles were bought by Red Ventures. In 2022, Red Ventures sold Metacritic and other entertainment websites to Fandom, Inc.

Influence 
Metacritic has been used by businesses to predict future sales. In 2007, Nick Wingfield of The Wall Street Journal wrote that Metacritic "influence[s] the sales of games and the stocks of video game publishers". He explains its influence as coming from the higher cost of buying video games than music or movie tickets. Many executives say that low scores "can hurt the long-term sales potential". Wingfield wrote that Wall Street pays attention to Metacritic and GameRankings because the sites typically post scores before sales data are publicly available, citing the respective rapid rise and fall in company values after BioShock and Spider-Man 3 were released. In an interview with The Guardian, Marc Doyle cited two major publishers that "conducted comprehensive statistical surveys through which they've been able to draw a correlation between high metascores and stronger sales" in certain genres. He claimed that an increasing number of businesses and financial analysts use Metacritic as "an early indicator of a game's potential sales and, by extension, the publisher's stock price". However, a 2015 study analyzing over 88 Xbox 360 and 80 PS3 games from 2012 found that Metacritic scores did not impact actual sales.

Controversially, the website has been used by game publishers as a means of determining whether a game's developer receives additional royalties. One notable example is the 2010 game Fallout: New Vegas, which received an average Metascore of 84, one short of the 85 points required by Bethesda Softworks, the game's publisher. As a result, its developer, Obsidian Entertainment, received no additional bonus. Columnists took issue with the company's use of Metacritic, with one suggesting that this makes game critics ultimately accountable for deciding the developer's profits and another pointing out that a Metascore of 84 is not significantly lower than 85. The latter also pointed out the impressive sales of five million sold units and US$300 million in revenue, and also noted a series of Obsidian's layoffs in 2011 and 2012.

The website has also been used by columnists and commentators as a general reference for critical reception, and by publishers as a tool of improving their products. Along with other executives, in 2008, John Riccitiello, then CEO of Electronic Arts, showed Wall Street analysts a chart illustrating a downward trend in the average critical ratings of the company's games. He took the ratings seriously and stressed the need for the company to bounce back. Also in 2008, Microsoft used Metacritic averages to delist underperforming Xbox Live Arcade games.

Metascores 
Scores are weighted averages. Certain publications are given more significance "because of their stature". Metacritic has said that it will not reveal the relative weight assigned to each reviewer.

Games Editor Marc Doyle was interviewed in 2008 by Keith Stuart of The Guardian to "get a look behind the metascoring process". Stuart wrote: "The Metascore phenomenon, namely Metacritic and GameRankings, have become an enormously important element of online games journalism over the past few years". Doyle said that because video games lead to a greater investment of time and money, gamers are more informed about reviews than are fans of film or music; they want to know "whether that hotly anticipated title is going to deliver".

In June 2018, Metacritic established the "Must-See" label for a movie that "achieves a Metascore of 81 or higher and has been reviewed by a minimum of 15 professional critics". In September 2018, it added the "Must-Play" certification for video games attaining a score of 90% or more, and a minimum number of 15 reviews from industry professionals.

The standalone highest-rated game of all time on the site is The Legend of Zelda: Ocarina of Time, with a 99. The three games with a 98 are Tony Hawk's Pro Skater 2, Grand Theft Auto IV, and Soulcalibur. There are about two dozen 97-rated games with standouts including Red Dead Redemption 2 and Grand Theft Auto V. There are nine movies that have received a 100: The Godfather; Citizen Kane; Rear Window; Casablanca; Boyhood; Three Colors: Red; Vertigo; Fanny and Alexander; and Notorious. There are five TV show seasons that have received a 99, including Season 4 of Rectify, Season 4 and Season 6 of The Larry Sanders Show, Season 1 of Murder One, and Season 5 of Breaking Bad. The standalone highest-rated album of all time on the site is Ten Freedom Summers by American trumpeter and composer Wadada Leo Smith, with a 99.

The standalone lowest-rated game of all time is Big Rigs: Over the Road Racing, with an 8. There are eleven movies that have received a 1, including Bio-Dome, 10 Rules for Sleeping Around, Chaos, Inappropriate Comedy, Not Cool, The Singing Forest, The Garbage Pail Kids Movie, Death of a Nation, Hardbodies, Mother's Day and United Passions. The standalone lowest-rated TV show of all time is The 1/2 Hour News Hour, with a 13. The standalone lowest-rated album of all time is Playing with Fire by Kevin Federline, with a 15.

Reception 
Metacritic received mixed reviews from website critics, commentators, and columnists. Its efficacy has been analyzed, with conclusions finding it to be generally useful or unreliable and biased. The website won two annual Webby Awards for excellence in the "Guides/Ratings/Reviews" category, in 2010 and 2015.

Criticism 
Metacritic has been criticized for converting all scoring systems into a single quantitative percentage-based scale. For example, an "A" score equates to the value of 100, an "F" the value of zero, and a "B−" the value of 67. Joe Dodson, former editor at Game Revolution, criticized Metacritic and similar sites for turning reviews into scores that he found to be too low. Doyle defended the grading system, believing that every scale should be converted directly to that of the website, with its lowest possible score being 0 and the highest 100. Further criticism was directed to the website's refusal to publicize how it aggregates scores.

According to Doyle, publishers often try to persuade him to exclude reviews they feel are unfair, but he said that once a publication is included, he refuses to omit any of its reviews. A Washington Post review of Uncharted 4 was assigned with a rating of 40/100 by Metacritic; this was the only negative review of the game. Readers who disapproved of the review petitioned Metacritic to remove the Post as a trusted source. As a result of its perceived negative influence on the industry, several reviewing sites, including Kotaku and Eurogamer, have dropped numerical reviews that would appear in Metacritic, instead favoring a qualitative assessment of a game. Kotaku also highlighted a practice alleged to be used by some publishers who use Metacritic scores as a way to leverage more favorable terms for the publisher or deny developers bonuses should they not reach a certain score. Doyle countered this by saying "Metacritic has absolutely nothing to do with how the industry uses our numbers... Metacritic has always been about educating the gamer. We're using product reviews as a tool to help them make the most of their time and money."

Metacritic has also been criticized for how it handles banning users and their reviews, with no notice or formal process for appeal. Critics and developers have pointed out that a product can suffer from rating manipulation by users, as by garnering low ratings that purposely damage its reputation or by receiving high ratings from throwaway accounts to make it appear more popular than it actually is. Signal Studios president and creative director Douglas Albright described the website as having no standards. In July 2020, Metacritic added a 36-hour waiting period for user reviews to be posted for video games at launch in an effort to reduce user score review-bombing during that period by users that have not played or barely played the game during a period when most players have not finished the game.

Some have noted that Metacritic scores for modern video games may not be accurately reflective of a game's state in the future due to post release updates and patches as well as most press reviews of games taking place around its launch. For example, the metascore for MediEvil (2019) was mixed mainly due to performance issues around the time of the game's launch. These issues were fixed in post-release patches that make the game run smoothly, which would have led to a higher metascore in its current state. Another example is online games such as Final Fantasy XIV Online and Warframe, which received mixed scores initially but became more well-received following improvements made after launch.

See also 
 Internet Movie Database (IMDb)
 Rating site
 OpenCritic

References

External links 

 

American entertainment news websites
Online film databases
Recommender systems
Former CBS Interactive websites
Fandom (website)
Internet properties established in 2001
Video game review aggregators
Music review websites
American film review websites
Webby Award winners
2020 mergers and acquisitions
2022 mergers and acquisitions